Unleash is the second extended play by Japanese rock band Band-Maid. The EP was released by Pony Canyon on September 21, 2022, and contains eight tracks, including the lead single "Sense". It debuted at number nine on the Oricon Albums Chart, selling 7,590 in its first week.

Background and recording
The songs on Unleash were taken from compositions that the band had worked on over the previous two years.

Composition and lyrics
Lead guitarist Kanami Tōno stated that she tries not to listen to rock bands, so that she won't be inspired by them. "From Now On" originated because lead vocalist Saiki Atsumi wanted to have a new instrumental. The song includes orchestral elements. Bassist Misa wrote her bass solo on a keyboard. Tōno wrote "Balance" with an image of bouncy song, but that would also feel futuristic and experimental. It includes lots of English words because rhythm guitarist/vocalist Miku Kobato wanted to use more strong words. Atsumi asked Kobato to make the beginning of the chorus in Japanese.

Atsumi asked Tōno to write "Unleash!!!!!" with the theme of the second phase of world domination. Tōno wanted the melody at the start of the song to be the hook as she feels that Atsumi has a very hook-laden voice. The vocal key was originally higher but Atsumi found it difficult to sing. It was the last song written for the EP. The tempo is 193.

"Sense" and "Corallium" originally appeared on the single for "Sense". They were approached to write "Sense" on New Year's Day 2021 and recorded it before summer. The lyrics are about the manga Platinum End. They were given free range with the lyrics, except that they had to include the words "angel" and "premonition". The orchestral intro was not originally part of the song, Tōno composed it after the producers of the anime asked them to include it.

Atsumi also wrote lyrics for "I'll", but Kobato's lyrics were chosen instead. "Corallium" is Atsumi's first lyrical composition. Kobato also wrote lyrics for the song, but Atsumi's lyrics were chosen instead. The song is about the ocean, which she is afraid of. She stated that she thinks the ocean is similar to love. Atsumi asked Tōno to write a song similar to "Alone" or "Choose Me".

"Influencer" is about women who live their lives through social media and want to be beautiful all the time. When Tōno was writing the song, she knew that she wanted to include a long bass solo. Drummer Akane Hirose consciously wanted to include simple and intense sounding drums without too much complexity.

"Hate?" is the oldest song on Unleash, it was written two years earlier as an instrumental. When Atsumi heard Tōno's demo for the song, Atsumi thought that Tōno was angry about something, which she denied, saying she had an image of an explosion. The lyrics were written at a time when Atsumi was seeing a lot of stories about infidelities in the news. Kobato also wrote lyrics for the song, but Atsumi's lyrics were chosen instead.

Critical reception

Accolades

Track listing
All music written by Band-Maid.

DVD/Blu-ray (Limited Edition)

Personnel
Band-Maid
Saiki Atsumi – lead vocals
Miku Kobato – rhythm guitar, vocals
Kanami Tōno – lead guitar
Misa – bass
Akane Hirose – drums

Charts

References

2022 EPs
Band-Maid albums
Pony Canyon EPs
Japanese-language EPs
EPs by Japanese artists